Elmore Township may refer to the following townships in the United States:

 Elmore Township, Daviess County, Indiana
 Elmore Township, Faribault County, Minnesota